Ali Bangcola Solaiman is a Moro revolutionary and politician. He is a member of the Moro Islamic Liberation Front (MILF) and the Interim Bangsamoro Parliament. He is also the Deputy Chief Minister of Bangsamoro for the Mainland.

He serves as the Moro Islamic Liberation Front's 2nd Vice Chairman and is also a member of the group's central committee.

When the Bangsamoro region was formed in 2019, Solaiman became part of the Bangsamoro Transition Authority. Solaiman was appointed as the Deputy Chief Minister of Bangsamoro for the Mainland by interim Chief Minister Murad Ebrahim. He served alongside Abdul Sahrin, who was appointed as deputy for the islands. The BTA later served as the Interim Bangsamoro Parliament.

Solaiman also heads the parliament's Special Committee on Marawi as its chairman. The body is responsible for overseeing the rehabilitation of Marawi, following the city's destruction in the 2017 Marawi siege.

References

Filipino Muslims
Members of the Bangsamoro Transition Authority Parliament
Year of birth missing (living people)
Living people
Moro Islamic Liberation Front members